Bulloch Hall is a Greek Revival mansion in Roswell, Georgia, built in 1839. It is one of several historically significant buildings in the city and is listed on the National Register of Historic Places. This is where Martha Bulloch Roosevelt ("Mittie"), mother of Theodore Roosevelt, 26th U.S. president, lived as a child.  It is also where she married Theodore Roosevelt's father, Theodore Roosevelt, Sr. The Roosevelt family are descendants of Archibald Bulloch, the first Governor of Georgia (1730-1777).

The antebellum mansion was built by Mittie's father, Major James Stephens Bulloch. He was a prominent planter from the Georgia coast, who was invited to the new settlement by his friend Roswell King. After the death of his first wife Hester Amarintha "Hettie" Elliott - mother of his son James D. Bulloch - Bulloch married the widow of his first wife's father, Martha "Patsy" Stewart Elliot, and had four more children:
 Anna Bulloch
 Martha Bulloch
 Charles Bulloch (who died young)
 Irvine Bulloch.

Major Bulloch selected a ten-acre plot of land and engaged a skilled builder, Willis Ball, to design and construct an elegant Greek Revival home. The Bulloch family lived in an abandoned Cherokee farmhouse while slaves and trained laborers built the house.
In 1839, Major Bulloch and his family moved into the completed house.

Soon Bulloch also owned land for cotton production and held enslaved African-Americans to work his fields. According to the 1850 Slave Schedules , Martha Stewart Elliott Bulloch, by then widowed a second time, owned 31 enslaved African-Americans. They mostly labored on cotton and crop production; but some would have worked in the home, on cooking and domestic tasks to support the family. Some of the known slaves who worked in the house were "Maum" Rose (cook), "Maum" Charlotte (housekeeper), "Maum" Grace (nursemaid), "Daddy" William, "Daddy" Luke, and Henry.

Birth and marriage of Martha Bulloch

In 1835 while living in Hartford, Connecticut, James' wife gave birth to a daughter, also named Martha. She was known affectionately as Mittie. Mittie was raised at Bulloch Hall.

Though the date of their initial meeting is unclear, we do know that when Theodore Roosevelt, Sr. was 19, he came to Roswell, Georgia with his friend Hilborne West, who was to marry Mittie's oldest half sister, Susan Elliott. Mittie was 15 at the time. "Thee," as he was called, met Mittie again when she went to Philadelphia in January 1853 to stay with her sister Susan. They fell in love and began planning their wedding through letters between Mittie in Roswell and Thee in New York. They were married in the dining room of Bulloch Hall on December 22, 1853. The marriage was a gala affair with people coming for many miles and staying for a week. Mittie's friend and bridesmaid, Mrs. William Baker, left a recollection of the wedding in an interview by Margaret "Peggy" Mitchell of Gone with the Wind fame, in the Atlanta Journal, June 10, 1923.

After the marriage, the couple moved to New York City. The couple lived with Thee's parents while a house, a wedding gift from them, was constructed at 28 E 20th Street. In 1856, Martha, Anna, and Irvine moved to Philadelphia to live with Martha's daughter Susan West. Anna and Martha later moved in with Mittie and Thee in New York. The Roosevelt couple became the parents of Anna; Theodore Roosevelt, the 26th President of the United States; Elliott, and Corinne. Later Elliott married Anna Rebecca Hall, and his daughter was First Lady of the United States, Eleanor Roosevelt.

President Roosevelt's visit in 1905

Theodore Roosevelt, who had begun his presidency on reasonably good terms for a half-northerner president, had infuriated the South by inviting Booker T. Washington to dine in the White House. Consequently, he waited a few years until the episode blew over and finally visited Bulloch Hall for the first time while touring the South in 1905.  He was thought to be the first sitting President of the United States to visit the South since the end of the American Civil War, however this is incorrect as William McKinley had visited the South earlier while celebrating the victory of the Spanish–American War.

President Roosevelt and his wife Edith arrived in Roswell, Georgia on October 20, 1905. At Bulloch Hall, he spoke as follows:

Eleanor Roosevelt visited Roswell and Bulloch Hall several times. Her husband Franklin Roosevelt visited the house, but did not leave his car.

Other
It was listed on the National Register of Historic Places individually and also as a contributing building in the Roswell Historic District.

Bulloch Hall mentioned in fiction
Summer, Edward. The Legend of Teddy Bear Bob aka Bear Bob's Story
 In 1974, director Monte Hellman used Bulloch Hall to film several scenes from the movie Cockfighter, starring Warren Oates.

Notes

References
 Roosevelt, Theodore. An Autobiography. (1913)
 Harbaugh, William Henry. The Life and Times of Theodore Roosevelt. (1963)
 Huddleston, Connie M. and Gwendolyn I. Koehler. "Mittie & Thee: An 1853 Roosevelt Romance." (nonfiction) (2015)
 Koehler, Gwendolyn I. and Connie M. Huddleston. "Between the Wedding & the War: The Bulloch/Roosevelt Letters 1854-1860) (2016)
 Morris, Edmund The Rise of Theodore Roosevelt (1979)
 Morris, Edmund Theodore Rex. (2001)
 Mowry, George. The era of Theodore Roosevelt and the birth of modern America, 1900-1912. (1954)
 McCullough, David. Mornings on Horseback: The Story of an Extraordinary Family, a Vanished Way of Life, and the Unique Child Who Became Theodore Roosevelt (2001)
 National Register Information System

External links
 Bulloch Hall official website
 Bulloch Hall historical marker

Antebellum architecture
Houses completed in 1840
Roswell, Georgia
Houses on the National Register of Historic Places in Georgia (U.S. state)
Plantation houses in Georgia (U.S. state)
Historic house museums in Georgia (U.S. state)
Museums in Fulton County, Georgia
Tourist attractions in Roswell, Georgia
National Register of Historic Places in Roswell, Georgia
Houses in Fulton County, Georgia
Greek Revival houses in Georgia (U.S. state)